John Alfred Meadows (13 November 1930 – March 2018), sometimes known as Jimmy Meadows, was an English professional footballer who made over 220 appearances as a wing half in the Football League for Watford.

Personal life 
Meadows' brothers Tony and Billy became amateur footballers.

Honours 
St Albans City

 Herts Senior Cup: 1950–51

Career statistics

References

English footballers
English Football League players
1930 births
2018 deaths
People from Hoxton
Association football wing halves
Association football inside forwards
Kingsbury Town F.C. players
Chelsea F.C. players
Willington A.F.C. players
St Albans City F.C. players
Watford F.C. players
Hillingdon Borough F.C. players
Isthmian League players